Blowing Rocks Preserve is an environmental preserve on Jupiter Island in Hobe Sound, Martin County, Florida, USA. It is owned by The Nature Conservancy. It contains the largest Anastasia limestone outcropping on the state's east coast. This distinctive spectacle thus earned the limestone outcrop's name. The limestone outcropping also encompasses coquina shells, crustaceans, and sand.

The preserve also features several coastal ecotones, including maritime hammocks, mangrove wetlands, and beach dunes. Common native species include sea grapes, gumbo limbo, and Sabal palms. Invasive exotic plants are removed in order to preserve indigenous flora. The preserve includes an educational center, native plant nursery, boardwalk, oceanside path, and a butterfly garden. The Hawley Education Center features rotating natural history and art exhibits, and offers environmental education classes and workshops.  A boardwalk along the Indian River Lagoon contains interpretive signs about the plants, wildlife and area environment.

References

External links
Blowing Rocks Preserve
USGS photos

Nature centers in Florida
Protected areas of Martin County, Florida
Nature Conservancy preserves
Nature reserves in Florida